These are the late night schedules for the four United States broadcast networks that offer programming during this time period, from September 2005 to August 2006. All times are Eastern or Pacific. Affiliates will fill non-network schedule with local, syndicated, or paid programming. Affiliates also have the option to preempt or delay network programming at their discretion.

Legend

Schedule

Monday-Friday

Saturday

By network

ABC

Returning series
ABC World News Now
ABC World News This Morning
Jimmy Kimmel Live!
Nightline

CBS

Returning series
CBS Morning News
Late Show with David Letterman
The Late Late Show with Craig Ferguson
Up to the Minute

Not returning from 2004-05:
The Late Late Show

Fox

Returning series
MADtv

NBC

Returning series
Early Today
Last Call with Carson Daly
Late Night with Conan O'Brien
Saturday Night Live
The Tonight Show with Jay Leno

References
TV Listings - New York Times http://tvlistings.zap2it.com/tvlistings/ZCGrid.do?fromTimeInMillis=1244797200000

United States late night network television schedules
2005 in American television
2006 in American television